Arthur Iturria (born 13 May 1994) is a French rugby union player, who plays for French Top 14 side, Clermont Auvergne.
Iturria was part of the French squad for the 2017 Six Nations Championship.

References

External links
FFR profile
ESPN Profile

1994 births
Living people
French rugby union players
French-Basque people
Sportspeople from Bayonne
France international rugby union players
ASM Clermont Auvergne players
Rugby union locks